The Rural City of Marong was a local government area about  north-northwest of Melbourne, the state capital of Victoria, Australia.

History

Marong was first incorporated as a road district on 27 August 1861, and became a shire on 23 December 1864. On 1 October 1990, the Shire of Marong became a rural city, under the Local Government Act 1989.

Amalgamation
The council briefly made State headlines in the circumstances surrounding its amalgamation. The Kennett Liberal government, elected in 1992, had embarked on an ambitious program of local government reform and restructuring across Victoria. Under the Local Government (General Amendment) Act 1993, a Local Government Board, chaired by Leonie Burke, was established to advise the State Government on municipal matters. In a report on 17 February 1994, the Local Government Board recommended that the five councils in the Bendigo region merge to form a "super city", with a population of about 81,000, much as Geelong had done the previous year. Marong, Eaglehawk and Huntly had earlier objected to the proposal, and the Board noted a weak no vote against the merger proposal in a referendum in the region; about 70% had voted against, but with a turnout of between 30% and 40% of eligible voters.

The three councils filed a writ in the Supreme Court, alleging failure to follow process by the Minister for Local Government, Roger Hallam, but by the time the new "super city" was announced, the writ had not yet been heard, and on 24 March 1994, the Rural City of Marong successfully applied for an injunction blocking the publication of the gazette the following day abolishing the five councils and appointing three commissioners, led by Peter Ross-Edwards, the former leader of the Victorian National Party. The government responded by introducing legislation, the City of Greater Bendigo Bill 1994, to Parliament, to effectively override the Supreme Court action, with Hallam saying "the bill would make clear that the Government is determined to achieve its objective for a more efficient municipal structure for the Bendigo region." Marong mayor Robert Hynes described the action as "terribly disappointing", adding, "One way or another, I believe it does mean an end to our fight... it seems the Government are above the law to me." On 6 April 1994, Marong voted to drop the Supreme Court action, effectively in doing so voting itself out of existence, and on 7 April 1994, the Rural City of Marong was abolished, and along with the City of Bendigo, the Borough of Eaglehawk and the Shires of Huntly and Strathfieldsaye, was merged into the newly created City of Greater Bendigo. On 29 April 1994, the Minister confirmed the Bill was not being proceeded with.

Wards

The Rural City of Marong was divided into three wards on 30 May 1988, each of which elected three councillors:
 Central Ward
 North Ward
 South Ward

Towns and localities
 Big Hill
 Bridgewater on Loddon
 Campbells Forest
 Crusoe Gully
 Derby
 Eastville
 Kangaroo Flat
 Laanecoorie
 Leichardt
 Lockwood
 Lockwood South
 Maiden Gully
 Marong*
 Myers Flat
 Newbridge
 Ravenswood
 Raywood
 Sebastian
 Shelbourne

* Council seat.

Population

* Estimate in the 1958 Victorian Year Book.

References

External links
 Victorian Places - Marong Shire and Rural City

Marong
1861 establishments in Australia